Susanne Hoffmann (born 17 August 1994) is an Austrian biathlete. She was born in Zell am See. She has competed in the Biathlon World Cup, and represented Austria at the Biathlon World Championships 2016.

External links

References

1994 births
Living people
Austrian female biathletes
People from Zell am See
Sportspeople from Salzburg (state)